King Ridge is a narrow rock ridge,  long, lying  southwest of Wrigley Bluffs in the Anderson Hills in the central Patuxent Range of the Pensacola Mountains, Antarctica. It was mapped by the United States Geological Survey from surveys and U.S. Navy air photos, 1956–66. The ridge was named by the Advisory Committee on Antarctic Names at the suggestion of Captain Finn Ronne, U.S. Navy Reserve, leader at Ellsworth Station, 1957: Colonel J. Caldwell King, U.S. Army, had assisted Ronne in obtaining support for the Ronne Antarctic Research Expedition, 1947–48.

References

Ridges of Queen Elizabeth Land